At the end of World War II, Poland underwent major changes to the location of its international border. In 1945, after the defeat of Nazi Germany, the Oder–Neisse line became its western border, resulting in gaining the Recovered Territories from Germany. The Curzon Line became its eastern border, resulting in the loss of the Eastern Borderlands to the Soviet Union.

Decision 
These decisions were in accordance with the decisions made first by the Allies at the Tehran Conference of 1943 where the Soviet Union demanded the recognition of the line proposed by British Foreign Secretary Lord Curzon in 1920.

The same Soviet stance was repeated by Joseph Stalin again at the Yalta Conference with Franklin D. Roosevelt and Winston Churchill in February 1945, but much more forcefully in the face of the looming German defeat. The new borders were ratified at the Potsdam Conference of August 1945 exactly as proposed by Stalin who already controlled the whole of East-Central Europe. Harry Truman remembered:

Large territories of Polish Second Republic were ceded to the Soviet Union by the Moscow-backed Polish government, and today form part of Lithuania, Belarus and Ukraine. Poland was instead given the Free State of Danzig and the German areas east of the rivers Oder and Neisse (see Recovered Territories), pending a final peace conference with Germany. Since a peace conference never took place, the lands were effectively ceded by Germany.

Population transfer 
The population transfer of both Polish and Germans 1945–46 included many millions of people. This difference amounts almost to the size of the Czech Republic, although Poland ended up with a much longer coastline on the Baltic Sea compared to its 1939 borders. In addition, the infrastructure in the former eastern territories of Germany was more developed than in the territories ceded to the Soviet Union.

Outcome
The prewar eastern Polish territories of Kresy, which the Red Army had overrun during the Nazi-Soviet invasion of Poland in 1939 (excluding the Białystok region) were permanently ceded to the USSR by the new Polish communist government, and most of their Polish inhabitants expelled. As a result of the Potsdam Agreement to which Poland's government-in-exile was not invited, Poland lost  (45%) of prewar territories in the east, including over 12 million citizens of whom 4.3 million were Polish-speakers. Today, these territories are part of sovereign Belarus, Ukraine, and Lithuania.

In turn, postwar Poland was assigned considerably smaller territories to the west including the prewar Free City of Danzig and the former territory of Germany east of the Oder–Neisse line, consisting of the southern portion of East Prussia and most of Pomerania, Neumark (East Brandenburg), and German Silesia. Poland also received the town of Swinemünde (now Świnoujście) on the island of Usedom and the city of Stettin (now Szczecin) on the western bank of the Oder river in accordance with the Potsdam Agreement. Therefore, these transferred territories did not then form part of the Soviet occupation zone of Germany or the subsequent state of East Germany.

The German population who had stayed at or had returned to their homes were forcibly expelled before these Recovered Territories (official term) were repopulated with Poles from Central Poland and by Poles expelled from the eastern regions and those from central Poland. The borders of Poland resembled the borders of the German-Russian gains in World War 2, with the exception of the city of Bialystok. This is called the Curzon line. The small area of Zaolzie, which had been annexed by Poland in late 1938, was returned to Czechoslovakia on Stalin's orders.

See also 
Former eastern territories of Germany
Geography of Poland
German–Polish Border Treaty of 1990
Molotov–Ribbentrop Pact
Peace of Riga
Polish–Soviet border agreement of August 1945
Polish–Soviet War
Territorial evolution of Poland
Territories of Poland annexed by the Soviet Union
Treaty of Zgorzelec of 1950

References 

Aftermath of World War II in Germany
Borders of Poland
Germany–Poland relations
Poland–Soviet Union relations
Aftermath of World War II in Poland
World War II